Arctostaphylos nissenana is a species of manzanita known by the common name Nissenan manzanita. It is endemic to California, where it grows in the woodlands and chaparral of the Sierra Nevada foothills, mostly in El Dorado County.

Description
Arctostaphylos nissenana is a shrub reaching a maximum height between one half and 1.5 meters, with gray bark and fuzzy twigs. The leaves are grayish in color, smooth or fuzzy, oval in shape, and 1 to 2 centimeters long. It blooms in plentiful small clusters of urn-shaped manzanita flowers, each with five lobes at its mouth. The fruit is a cylindrical drupe a few centimeters long which contains five seeds.

References

External links
Jepson Manual Treatment
USDA Plants Profile
Photo gallery

nissenana
Endemic flora of California
Flora of the Sierra Nevada (United States)
Natural history of the California chaparral and woodlands
Natural history of El Dorado County, California
Plants described in 1918